The Great Pumpkin is an unseen character in the comic strip Peanuts by Charles M. Schulz. According to Linus van Pelt, the Great Pumpkin is a legendary personality who rises from the pumpkin patch on Halloween carrying a large bag of toys to deliver to believing children. Linus continues to maintain faith in the Great Pumpkin, despite his friends' mockery and disbelief. 

The Great Pumpkin was first introduced in the strip dated October 26, 1959, and Schulz subsequently reworked the premise many times throughout the run of Peanuts, notably inspiring the 1966 animated television special It's the Great Pumpkin, Charlie Brown.

While Schulz usually avoided outright politics, he enjoyed his Great Pumpkin strips and incorporating religious references in many comics and animated cartoons.

Premise
Each year Linus awaits the arrival of the Great Pumpkin in a pumpkin patch deemed most sincere and lacking in hypocrisy. The following morning, each year, an embarrassed yet undefeated Linus vows to wait for the Great Pumpkin again next Halloween. Linus acknowledges the similarities between the Great Pumpkin and Santa Claus (in the television special, Linus writes to the Great Pumpkin that Santa Claus has better publicity). Charlie Brown attributes Linus's belief in the Great Pumpkin to "denominational differences." 

In the comic strip dated October 25, 1961, Linus explains: "There are three things I have learned never to discuss with people: religion, politics, and the Great Pumpkin." A few days later, Linus claims previously reported official sightings of the Great Pumpkin in Connecticut and Texas, and Charlie Brown hears of a sighting in New Jersey.

Linus remains faithful to the Great Pumpkin, even devising a Great Pumpkin Newsletter in comic strips dated October 1998.

Religious metaphors
The Great Pumpkin has been cited as a symbol of strong faith and foolish faith, leading to vastly different interpretations of creator Charles Schulz's own faith. As described in the book on Schulz's religious views, A Charlie Brown Religion, Schulz's views were very personal and often misinterpreted. Linus' seemingly unshakable belief in the Great Pumpkin, and his desire to foster the same belief in others, has been interpreted as a parody of Christian evangelism by some observers. Others have seen Linus' belief in the Great Pumpkin as symbolic of the struggles faced by anyone with beliefs or practices that are not shared by the majority. Still others view Linus' lonely vigils, in the service of a being that may or may not exist and which never makes its presence known in any case, as a metaphor for mankind's basic existential dilemmas.

Schulz himself, however, claimed no motivation beyond the humor of having one of his young characters confuse Halloween with Christmas. In the 1959 sequence of strips in which the Great Pumpkin is first mentioned, for instance, Schulz also has Linus suggest that he and the other kids "go out and sing pumpkin carols", something which he also asks the trick-or-treating kids in the special itself.

In animated adaptations

After the Great Pumpkin formed the central premise of the 1966 television special, later television specials would also reference the character. These included You're Not Elected, Charlie Brown (1972) when Linus almost blows his chances in a school election; It's the Easter Beagle, Charlie Brown (1974) in which Sally cites her previous experience with the non-appearance of the Great Pumpkin; and You're a Good Sport, Charlie Brown (1975), wherein Linus enters the pumpkin patch with Charlie Brown, who gets teased as being the Great Pumpkin. The Peanuts Movie (2015) also namedrops the character, when Linus says he hopes the new kid in town (later revealed as the Little Red-Haired Girl) might be willing to believe in the Great Pumpkin.

Other references in popular culture

Dee Andros
College football coach Dee Andros (1924–2003), was known by the nickname "The Great Pumpkin" as head coach (1965–75) and athletic director (1976–85) at Oregon State University in Corvallis.

As the head coach of the orange and black Beavers, Andros had a round physique and often wore an orange windbreaker. He was first dubbed with the nickname in 1966 by a member of the Spokane press on Halloween weekend in Pullman, Washington, as his OSU team routed host Washington State's Cougars, 41–13.

Braniff Airways
In the late 1970s, Braniff Airways painted its fleet in bright colors, for visual appeal and marketability. The airline's first 747-100 airliners were delivered painted in a striking shade of orange, causing several air traffic control centers across the US to welcome the new Braniff acquisitions with the phrase "Welcome, Great Pumpkin". The 1973 Petersen Publications annual, Air Progress: World's Greatest Aircraft, had its chapter devoted to the 747 headed "The Great Pumpkin Lives!"

BNSF Railway
In 1996, Burlington Northern SD60M #9297 (renumbered 8197 in 2008, renumbered 1474 in 2014) was jokingly dubbed the "Great Pumpkin" by employees because of its bold orange paint scheme, one of many prototype paint designs created by the then newly formed Burlington Northern and Santa Fe Railway (BNSF), a merger of Burlington Northern and the Atchison, Topeka, and Santa Fe Railway (Santa Fe). This scheme eventually became the basis for BNSF's "Heritage I" paint design, while the "Great Pumpkin" nickname has stuck among railfans for this particular locomotive.

The Cleveland Show
One episode from season 2 was called "It's the Great Pancake, Cleveland Brown".

The Simpsons
In the opening cameo of "Treehouse of Horror II" the Peanuts gang in Halloween costumes are passing in front of the Simpson house. The final segment of "Treehouse of Horror XIX" (the fourth episode of the twentieth season of The Simpsons), called "It's the Grand Pumpkin, Milhouse", is a parody of It's the Great Pumpkin, Charlie Brown and contains numerous references to the Peanuts characters. Milhouse Van Houten wears the same clothes and plays the same role as Linus van Pelt. Lisa Simpson is modeled after Sally Brown, and Bart is patterned after Charlie Brown (even saying "Good grief!" at one point). A redesigned version of Santa's Little Helper can be seen sleeping atop his dog house a la Snoopy, while Homer is seen sleeping on top of the family house in a similar manner.

When Marge first speaks, her voice is replaced with a muted trombone sound, a parody of the "wah wah wah" voice that is used for adults in all Peanuts specials. The dance scene during the Halloween party is a parody of the dance scene in A Charlie Brown Christmas right down to Kang and Kodos in a nonspeaking cameo as the twins "3 and 4". Parts of the segment had music by Vince Guaraldi (best known for composing music for animated adaptations of the Peanuts comic strip), which they had obtained the rights to use.

Robot Chicken
A sketch in the episode "Vegetable Funfest" of the stop-motion parody show Robot Chicken featured a Peanuts parody in which Linus tires of never seeing the Great Pumpkin. He conducts a magical ritual involving burning a chicken in a pentagram to summon the entity, which is revealed to be Lovecraftian in nature, feeding on children. The Great Pumpkin murders Linus and proceeds to stalk the other characters with similar intentions. Charlie Brown is saved by the similarly demonic Kite-Eating Tree, which consumes the Pumpkin. Charlie Brown declares that his deceased friends can now rest in peace. The murdered characters are then shown in Hell dancing with the devil as Schroeder plays his piano.

Italy and the "Great Watermelon"
When the Peanuts strip was first introduced in Italy, Halloween was almost unknown there as a festivity. The earlier translations turned the pumpkin into a watermelon ("Il Grande Cocomero") because it was felt to be a more Mediterranean fruit-figure and its name sounded better. The intentional mistranslation somehow stuck in Italian pop culture, and was kept in all subsequent translations. There was also a movie named after Il grande cocomero in 1993, directed by Francesca Archibugi.

Dan Johnson
The Major League Baseball player Dan Johnson is nicknamed "The Great Pumpkin" due to his orange-red beard and his notable late-season/autumn performance. Johnson was called to the majors late in three separate seasons (2008, 2010, 2011), and subsequently hit clutch home runs that propelled his team into the playoffs.

Supernatural
Season 4, episode 7 of the television series Supernatural is called "It's the Great Pumpkin, Sam Winchester".

Wizard of Id
On October 30, 2015, the Wizard of Id comic strip made a tribute to Linus and the Great Pumpkin. The wizard makes a spell "making a dream come true for a special little boy". The last panel shows the Great Pumpkin menacingly chasing Linus, who runs away terrified.

Helloween
Charlie Brown, Linus, and the Great Pumpkin are referenced in Helloween's song "Halloween", alluding to the events in It's the Great Pumpkin, Charlie Brown:

"Someone's sitting in a field, never giving yield.
Sitting there with gleaming eyes.
Waiting for Big Pumpkin to arise."

"Bad luck if you get a stone
like the good old Charlie Brown, you think Linus could be right.
The kids will say it's just a stupid lie."

The Great Pumpkin
In 1965 a song by The Jack-o-Lanterns was produced by Lou Reizner and released on 45.  The composers were Danny and Myrna Jannson, along with Walter Keske.  The song starts with the sound of a gong, a creaking door, then the voice speaks "My name is The Great Pumpkin.  Whataya want sonny boy?"  The singers of the song then tell The Great Pumpkin they are lonely and have no one to love.  They're asking them for help saying they're his "last chance."  At the end of the song the Pumpkin responds only by saying, "The Great Pumpkin he say you’ll never make the Top 40 Sunny Boy.”

Licensed use in Poptropica
In October 2010, forty-four years after the initial airing of It's the Great Pumpkin, Charlie Brown, the Great Pumpkin was the topic of a licensed use by the online game Poptropica. The site's 15th island is Great Pumpkin Island, and features several of the Peanuts characters interacting with players. As the island follows the same plot as the original TV special, the Great Pumpkin does not appear, and turns out to be Snoopy with a pumpkin on his head.

See also
Stingy Jack
The Pumpkin King
Treehouse of Horror XIX
David S. Pumpkins

References

Comics characters introduced in 1959
Halloween
Halloween in the United States
Holiday characters
Peanuts characters
Unseen characters